Throughout July and August 2011, various teams played Test match and non-test match fixtures for the 2011 Rugby World Cup in New Zealand. The matches were primarily in the Northern Hemisphere involving the Six Nations Championship teams. Although Tier 2 European sides did play some fixtures against domestic clubs from the Aviva Premiership and Pro12.

Fixtures

 

 Fiji won the two-test Pinjas Rugby Series on points difference.

 This game is part of the European Nations Cup .

See also
 2011 mid-year rugby union tests
 2011 Rugby World Cup

References

warm-ups
2011
2011–12 in European rugby union
2011–12 in Japanese rugby union
2011 in Oceanian rugby union
2011 in South American rugby union
2011 in North American rugby union